Pseudotolida ephippiata is a beetle in the genus Pseudotolida of the family Mordellidae. It was described in 1891 by George Charles Champion.

References

Mordellidae
Beetles described in 1891